The Mengpui is a river of Mizoram, northeastern India. It rises near Lunglei town in Chhimtuipui district.

References

Rivers of Mizoram
Rivers of India